The Roman Catholic Church in Equatorial Guinea (former Spanish colony in West Africa) is composed only of a Latin hierarchy, joint in a national Episcopal Conference of Equatorial Guinea, comprising one ecclesiastical province consisting of the Metropolitan Archdiocese and four suffragan dioceses.

There are no Eastern Catholic, pre-diocesan or other exempt jurisdictions.

There are no titular sees. All defunct jurisdictions have current successor sees.

There is formally an Apostolic Nunciature as papal diplomatic representation (embassy-level) to Equatorial Guinea, but it is vested in the Apostolic Nunciature to neighbor Cameroon, in its capital Yaoundé.

Current Latin dioceses

Ecclesiastical Province of Malabo 
 Metropolitan Archdiocese of Malabo
Roman Catholic Diocese of Bata
Roman Catholic Diocese of Ebebiyin
Roman Catholic Diocese of Evinayong
Roman Catholic Diocese of Mongomo

See also 
 List of Catholic dioceses (structured view)
 Catholic Church in Equatorial Guinea

References

Sources and external links 
 GCatholic.org - data for all sections.
 Catholic-Hierarchy entry.

Equatorial Guinea
Catholic dioceses